California's 11th district may refer to:

 California's 11th congressional district
 California's 11th State Assembly district
 California's 11th State Senate district